Sharifabad (also Romanized as Sharīfābād) is a village in Howmeh Rural District, in the Central District of Abhar County, Zanjan Province, Iran. At the 2006 census, its population was 5,521, in 1,467 families.

References 

Populated places in Abhar County